Grant Johnson may refer to:
Home Run Johnson (Grant Johnson, 1872–1963), American baseball player
Grant Johnson (footballer) (born 1972), Scottish former footballer
Grant A. Johnson, American television soap opera director
Grant S. Johnson, American screenwriter, film director, and producer
 Grant W. Johnson (1903–1965), American politician who served in the New York State Assembly

See also
Johnson Grant (1773–1844), Scottish divine